Brian Segal  (born 1943) is a Canadian former publishing executive and university administrator. He was the president and CEO of the Rogers Publishing division of Rogers Communications.

Previously, Segal had been president of Ryerson Polytechnical Institute from 1980 to 1988 and president of the University of Guelph from 1988 until 1992 when he left to join Maclean Hunter Publications (now Rogers Publishing) as the publisher of Maclean's magazine.  He served a publisher of Maclean's magazine and vice-president of Rogers Publishing until 1999 when he became President and CEO of Rogers Publishing until retiring in 2012.

In his academic career, Segal had earned his undergraduate degree at McGill University from 1960-1964, a Master of Social Work at Yeshiva University from 1964-1967 and an MSc and PhD from the University of Pittsburgh from 1967-1971 with a speciality in public health. He subsequently taught at Florida State University from 1971 -1973, Carleton University from 1973-1980, and then Ryerson University where he entered administration.
He has also been chair of the Board of Trustees of the National Institute of Nutrition, chair of the Government of Canada's National Innovations Advisory Committee and a director of IBM Canada, Union Gas, Sun Life Trust and Schneider Corporation as well as a past chairman of the Shaw Festival.  Other positions include a Strategic Planning Director with the Canadian Government's Department of Secretary of State, Founding member of Design Exchange, and a Campaign Cabinet member for the United Way of Toronto.

Honors and Awards of Mr. Segal include a Doctor of Laws (Honoris Causa) from Ryerson University 2008, and Legacy Laureate from the University of Pittsburgh in 2011.  In 2009 he was named Ryerson University's Distinguished Visiting Executive, and Chair of the Ted Rogers Leadership Centre. Segal was made a member of the Order of Canada in 2021.

He is the brother of former Canadian Senator Hugh Segal.

References

1943 births
Living people
Businesspeople from Ontario
Academic staff of Carleton University
McGill University alumni
Presidents of Toronto Metropolitan University
Rogers Communications
University of Pittsburgh School of Public Health alumni
Yeshiva University alumni
Canadian Jews
Florida State University faculty
Canadian chief executives
Presidents of the University of Guelph
Canadian university and college chief executives